Larantuka Malay is a contact variety of Malay spoken in and around the city of Larantuka on the island of Flores in Indonesia, and in two enclaves: the village of Wure on the island of Adonara (across a narrow strait from Larantuka) and four villages on Konga Bay, about 40 kilometers south of Larantuka on Flores, and serves more generally as a lingua franca on the eastern tip of Flores and nearby islands. There are approximately 23,000 native speakers of Larantuka Malay. Second language speakers of Larantuka Malay are primarily found in and around the city of Larantuka and through the eastern part of Flores island, as well as the nearby islands of Adonara, Solor and Lembata (Lomblen), and natively speak Lamaholot or other languages closely related to Lamaholot, which, until recently, were believed to be dialects of Lamaholot.

The city of Larantuka today is a fairly homogeneous community, and although it is largely made up of speakers of Larantuka Malay, many of whom who trace their ancestry back to Portuguese settlers and their followers from the Malay peninsula who arrived in Larantuka in the 17th century, it actually had roots in diverse communities drawn to the settlement. The Larantuka Malay community maintains a separate cultural and linguistic identity from the Lamaholot speakers who surround the city. Larantuka Malay serves as the main language of daily life in the city, and is the native language of a majority of the population.

Larantuka Malay is known by its speakers as 'Bahasa Nagi', a name probably deriving from the word negeri, meaning ‘village’ (ultimately from Sanskrit). Nagi is also the term for the city and the ethnic group who speak the language. The community has a strong ethnic identity, and, unlike in other parts of eastern Indonesia where vernacular forms of Malay are spoken, speakers of Larantuka Malay tend to differentiate their language from the standardized national language, Indonesian, although some interference does occur.

History 
Larantuka was a Portuguese outpost from the late sixteenth century until the mid nineteenth century, and for part of that period, from the fall of the Portuguese settlement in Solor in 1613 until the rise of the Portuguese colony in East Timor, it was Portugal’s chief colony in the region. It is therefore not surprising that the Portuguese language has had a profound effect on the development of Larantuka Malay. Even more importantly, when the Portuguese stronghold in Malacca fell to the Dutch in 1641, the Portuguese authorities fled to Larantuka, bringing with them about 2000 followers, servants and slaves from Malacca, who were speakers of peninsular Malay. As a result, the influence of peninsular Malay can be seen in the phonology and lexicon of Larantuka Malay. Many Larantuka families trace their origins to the Portuguese and even to Malacca. Many Larantukans today have Portuguese family names, although they are not always immediately recognizable as such (the common family name Karwayu derives from Portuguese Carvalho, for example). The prevalence of Portuguese family names is at least partly due to intermarriage, but also to baptism practices.

Larantuka Malay has a very different history than other contact varieties of Malay in eastern Indonesia. Unlike Manado, Ternate, Banda, Ambon and Kupang, it was not a trade center or regional administrative center, and Malay was never an important trade language. Unlike the other six varieties, it was never used as a lingua franca between peoples of varying linguistic backgrounds. Unlike the other varieties, there has never been any significant language shift in eastern Flores from vernacular languages to Malay. The speakers today of Larantuka Malay represent the descendants of Malay speakers (which likely included both first and second language speakers) who were transplanted to the region in the mid 17th century. This unique history has had an effect on the development and maintenance of the Larantuka Malay language, and this effect can be seen in the form of the language today.

References
Adelaar, K.A. and Prentice, D.J. 1996. Malay: its History, Role and Spread. In Wurm, Stephen A., Mühlhäusler, Peter, and Tryon, Darrell T. (eds.)  Atlas of Languages of Intercultural Communication in the Pacific, Asia, and the Americas (Volume II.1: Texts). Berlin: Mouton de Gruyter.
Dietrich, Stefan. 1997. Richtungsbegriffe im malaiischen Dialekt von Larantuka (Ostindonesien). Anthropos 92: 101-114.
Kumanireng, Threes Y. 1982. Diglossia in Larantuka, Flores: A Study about Language Use and Language Switching among the Larantuka Community, in Halim, Amran, Carrington, Lois, and Wurm, S.A. (eds.) Papers from the Third International Conference on Austronesian Linguistics, vol. 3: Accent on Variety. Pacific Linguistics C-76. Canberra: Australian National University. pp. 131–136.
___ 1993. Struktur Kata dan Struktur Frasa Bahasa Melayu Larantuka. Ph.D. dissertation, University of Indonesia, Jakarta, Indonesia.
Monteiro, F. 1975. Kamus Dwi Bahasa: Dialek Melayu Larantuka (Flores) – Bahasa Indonesia. Unpublished Manuscript.
Monteiro, F., Sanga, F., Hayon, Y., and Fernandez, S. 1985. Laporan Hasil Penelitian Morfologi dan Sintaksis Bahasa Melayu Larantuka. Unpublished report prepared for the Project for the Investigation of Indonesian  and Regional Language and Arts, Department of Education and Culture, East Nusa Tenggara.
Paauw, S. 2008. Larantuka Malay, in The Malay Contact Varieties of Eastern Indonesia: A Typological Comparison. Ph.D. Dissertation, University at Buffalo, Buffalo, NY, USA.
Steinhauer, H. 1991. Malay in East Indonesia: the Case of Larantuka (Flores), in  H. Steinhauer (ed.), Papers in Austronesian Linguistics No. 1, Pacific Linguistics Series A-81, Canberra: Australian National University. pp. 177–195.

Agglutinative languages
Languages of Indonesia
Malay-based pidgins and creoles
Malay dialects
Malayic languages